The Warren Rawson Building is a historic multi-unit residence at 68-74 Franklin Street in Arlington, Massachusetts.  It is a rare surviving farm worker's dormitory, built in 1895 by Warren Rawson, a leading garden farmer in Arlington around the turn of the 20th century.  It is a long rectangular -story wood-frame building, with its gable end to the street.  Access to the inside is via a pair of entrances on the long side which are sheltered by modest porches.

The building was listed on the National Register of Historic Places in 1985.

See also
Warren Rawson House, a worker's housing rowhouse built by Rawson 
National Register of Historic Places listings in Arlington, Massachusetts

References

Residential buildings on the National Register of Historic Places in Massachusetts
Buildings and structures in Arlington, Massachusetts
National Register of Historic Places in Arlington, Massachusetts